Heike Engelhardt (born 5 June 1961) is a German politician of the Social Democratic Party (SPD) who has been serving as a member of the Bundestag since 2021.

Early life and education
Engelhardt was born 1961 in the West German city of Stuttgart.

Political career
Engelhardt was elected to the Bundestag in 2021, representing the Ravensburg district.

In parliament, Engelhardt has been serving on the Health Committee and the Committee on Human Rights and Humanitarian Aid.

In addition to her committee assignments, Engelhardt is part of the German Parliamentary Friendship Group for Relations with the Andean States. She has been a member of the German delegation to the Parliamentary Assembly of the Council of Europe (PACE) since 2022. In the Assembly, she serves on the Committee on Social Affairs, Health and Sustainable Development and the Sub-Committee on Gender Equality.

Within her parliamentary group, Engelhardt belongs to the Parliamentary Left, a left-wing movement.

Other activities
 German United Services Trade Union (ver.di), Member (since 2001)
 Education and Science Workers' Union (GEW), Member (since 1984)
 German Federation for the Environment and Nature Conservation, Member

References 

Living people
1961 births
Politicians from Stuttgart
Social Democratic Party of Germany politicians
Members of the Bundestag 2021–2025
21st-century German politicians
21st-century German women politicians
Female members of the Bundestag
Members of the Bundestag for Baden-Württemberg